John Leek may refer to:
John Leek (priest) (died 1369), Canon of Windsor
John Leek (died c.1415), MP for Nottinghamshire
John Leek (died c.1449), MP for Nottinghamshire

See also
John Leak, VC recipient
John Leake (disambiguation)
John Leeke, Anglican bishop